The 1980 Currie Cup was the 42nd edition of the Currie Cup, the premier annual domestic rugby union competition in South Africa.

Results

Semi-finals

Final

See also

 Currie Cup

References

1980
1980 in South African rugby union
1980 rugby union tournaments for clubs